Maja Bogiçaj (Bogićaj) is a peak of the Accursed Mountains range. It is located on the border of Kosovo and Albania. One of the closest peaks is Tromeđa which is just found north-west of Bogiçaj peak.

Notes

References 

 

Mountains of Albania
Accursed Mountains
Mountains of Kosovo
International mountains of Europe
Albania–Kosovo border
Geography of Kukës County